Francisco do Borja Pereira do Amaral (10 October 1898–1 May 1989) was a Brazilian bishop. He served as Bishop of Lorena (1941-1944) and Bishop of Taubaté (1944-1976). He attended all four sessions of the Second Vatican Council. He was a supporter of lay apostolates, especially Catholic Action.

References

1898 births
1989 deaths
Roman Catholic bishops of Lorena
Roman Catholic bishops of Taubaté